NKF may refer to:

Computing
Network Kanji Filter (NKF Japanese Encoder)

Organizations
National Kidney Foundation
National Kidney Foundation Singapore
Norwegian Association for Women's Rights
USA National Karate-do Federation

Companies
NKF, former Netherlands Cable Works, now Prysmian in Delft.

de:Neues kommunales Finanzmanagement